Čachotín  is a municipality and village in Havlíčkův Brod District in the Vysočina Region of the Czech Republic. It has about 200 inhabitants.

Gallery

References

Villages in Havlíčkův Brod District